Missing Evidence is a 1939 American drama film, directed by Phil Rosen. It stars Preston Foster, Irene Hervey, and Inez Courtney, and was released on December 15, 1939.

Cast list
 Preston Foster as Bill Collins
 Irene Hervey as Linda Parker
 Inez Courtney as Nellie Conrad
 Chick Chandler as Jerry Howard
 Noel Madison as Paul Duncan
 Joseph Downing as Marty Peters
 Oscar O'Shea as Pop Andrews
 Tom Dugan as Binky Cullen
 Ray Walker as McBride
 Cliff Clark as Allen Jennings

References

External links 
 
 
 

Universal Pictures films
Films directed by Phil Rosen
1939 drama films
1939 films
American drama films
American black-and-white films
Lottery fraud in fiction
1930s American films
1930s English-language films